The Young Bukharans or Mladobukharans were a secret society founded in Bukhara in 1909, which was part of the jadidist movement seeking to reform and modernize Central Asia along Western-scientific lines.

In March 1918 they tried to seize power in Bukhara, with help from the Tashkent Soviet, and the Young Bukharans had to flee from the Emir, Mohammed Alim Khan to Tashkent. They returned in May 1920, and this time were successful: the Red Army took Bukhara and the Young Bukharans formed the first government of the Bukharan People's Soviet Republic. Most of the members purged during 1936–1938.

Young Khivans and Young Bukharans inspired the Kashgar 1933 Association of Independence.

Prominent members
Abdurrauf Fitrat
Abdul Kadir Mukhitdinov
Faizullah Khojaev
Osman Kocaoğlu
Akmal Ikramov
Mahmudkhodja Behbudiy
Munawwar Qari

See also
Young Kashgar Party
Young Khivans
Revolutionary Young Bukharan Party

References

Muslim National Communism in the Soviet Union: A Revolutionary Strategy for the Colonial World by Alexandre A. Bennigsen and S.Enders Wimbush, University of Chicago Press, 1980
Russia's Protectorates in Central Asia: Bukhara and Khiva, 1865-1924 by Seymour Becker

Islam in Russia
Islam in the Soviet Union
Secret societies
Emirate of Bukhara
Uzbek revolutionaries
Political parties established in 1909
Political parties of minorities in Imperial Russia
Political parties of the Russian Revolution
Bukharan People's Soviet Republic